The Asia/Oceania Zone is one of the three zones of regional Davis Cup competition in 2015.

Participating nations

Seeds:
 
 
 
 

Remaining nations:

Draw

 and  relegated to Group III in 2016.
 promoted to Group I in 2016.

First round

Chinese Taipei vs. Lebanon

Philippines vs. Sri Lanka

Indonesia vs. Iran

Pakistan vs. Kuwait

Second round

Chinese Taipei vs. Philippines

Indonesia vs. Pakistan

Play-off

Sri Lanka vs. Lebanon

Iran vs. Kuwait

Third round

Pakistan vs. Chinese Taipei

Notes
a. The tie was moved to Colombo due to security concerns.
b. The tie was moved to İzmir due to security concerns.

References

Draw

Asia Oceania Zone II
Davis Cup Asia/Oceania Zone